James De Lancey (September 6, 1746 – May 2, 1804) was a colonial American who led one of the best known and most feared of the loyalist units, De Lancey's Brigade, during the American Revolution. He was known as the "Commander of the Cowboys" by the loyalists and by the Patriots he was known as the "Outlaw of the Bronx".  He later became a political figure in Nova Scotia. He represented Annapolis Township in the Nova Scotia House of Assembly from 1786 to 1794.  He has become a controversial figure for unsuccessfully trying to use the courts to retrieve a slave he brought to Nova Scotia.

Early life
He was born in Westchester County, New York, the son of Peter DeLancey (1705–1770) and Elizabeth (née Colden) DeLancey. Among his siblings was brother Stephen DeLancey, also a member of the Nova Scotia Assembly, and sister Susan DeLancey, who was married to Thomas Henry Barclay, a lawyer who also became one of the United Empire Loyalists in Nova Scotia and served in the colony's government. Another sister, the socialite, Alice De Lancey Izard, married Ralph Izard, who later represented South Carolina in the United States Senate.

His paternal grandparents were French immigrant Etienne DeLancey and Anne (née Van Cortlandt) DeLancey, herself the third child of Gertrude (née Schuyler) Van Cortlandt and Stephanus Van Cortlandt, the Chief Justice of the Province of New York.  His maternal grandfather, Cadwallader Colden, and his uncle, James DeLancey served as Colonial Governors of New York.

Career
He served as sheriff of Westchester County from 1769 to 1776 and as an officer in the militia.  Because of his loyalist sympathies, he was forced to leave the area and went to New York City, where he and his uncle, Oliver De Lancey, raised a loyalist unit known as "De Lancey's Brigade", "De Lancey’s Cowboys", and "De Lancey's refugees". De Lancey himself was called the "Outlaw of the Bronx".

Forces under Delancy ambushed and killed Colonel Christopher Greene and Major Ebenezer Flagg of the Rhode Island Regiment of the Continental Army at the Battle of Pine's Bridge on May 14, 1781.  From one account of the attack, "his body was found in the woods, about a mile distant from his tent, cut, and mangled in the most shocking way." A common conjecture is that this indignity was retribution for his leading black soldiers against the British Crown.

Nova Scotia

Around the start of 1783, following the Patriot victory in the American Revolution, he moved to Nova Scotia, settling at Round Hill in Annapolis County.  De Lancey was elected to the provincial assembly after his brother Stephen accepted an office in the Bahamas.  James took his seat  representing Annapolis Township from Feb. 26, 1790 until he was named to the province's Council in 1794 by Governor Wentworth.

He resigned from his seat on the council in 1801 due to poor health.  A slave owner, he was thwarted by Richard John Uniacke in his efforts to have slavery legally recognized in Nova Scotia.

Personal life
In 1784, he married Martha Tippett (1760–1837), the daughter of William Tippett and Martha (née Hunt) Tippett. Together, they were the parents of 10 children, six sons and four daughters, including:

 William DeLancey (1783–1869)
 Peter DeLancey (1802–1882)

De Lancey died at Round Hill three years after resigning from the Council on May 2, 1804, at the age of 57.  There is a prominent monument marking the burial ground.

References
Notes

Sources

External links
 

1746 births
1804 deaths
Schuyler family
Loyalist military personnel of the American Revolutionary War
Nova Scotia pre-Confederation MLAs
Loyalists in the American Revolution from New York (state)
People from Westchester County, New York
Loyalists who settled Nova Scotia
History of the Bronx
De Lancey family
People of the Province of New York
Burials in Canada
Canadian slave owners